Macrophya montana is a sawfly (order Hymenoptera, family Tenthredinidae).

Distribution
This common species is widespread in most of Europe and it is also present in North Africa, Turkey and Iran.

Habitat
It prefers forest edges, thickets and slopes and occurs in a wide range of elevations above sea level.

Description

Macrophya montana can reach a length of 8-12mm. This species shows an evident sexual dimorphism.

The females are recognisable by black and yellow markings. The head is black with yellow clypeus and labrum. On the abdomen the first tergite is completely yellow, the fifth and sixth are broad, yellow, interrupted in the middle. On the seventh, sometimes also on the fourth, there are small yellow spots on the sides. Also the ninth tergite is yellow. These markings are absent on the abdomen of the males, that are completely black.

In the females the legs are predominantly yellow with black markings. In the males the first two pairs of legs are pale yellow, while the hind legs are mainly black, but the tips of the tibias and part of tarsi are white.

Biology
The adults of this sawfly can mostly be encountered from May through July. Adults mainly feed on pollen and  nectar, especially on Heracleum sphondylium, but they feed also on honeydew and small insects. The larvae are monophagous and develop on  the leaves of blackberries and raspberries (Rubus fruticosus).

References

 R.R. Benson: Symphyta (Section b, Tenthredinidae). Handbook for the identification of British insects Vol. 6 part 2b. London 1952. published by the Royal Entomological Society London.

Tenthredinidae
Insects described in 1763
Taxa named by Giovanni Antonio Scopoli